A reaper is a farm tool or machine for harvesting grain.

Reaper may also refer to:

Arts and entertainment

Artwork
 Reaper (Van Gogh series), a 1889 series of paintings by Vincent van Gogh
 The Reaper (Miró painting), a lost 1937 painting by Joan Miró
 The Reaper (Bohland), a 1952 sculpture by Gustav Bohland in Milwaukee, Wisconsin

Film and television
 The Reaper (2013 film), a Mexican film
 The Reaper (2014 film), a Croatian-Slovenian film
 Reaper (film), a 2014 American horror/crime film
 Reaper Award, an American horror-film award
 Reaper (TV series), a 2007–2009 American comedy-drama series
 [[Reaper (Smallville)|"Reaper" (Smallville)]], a television episode
 "The Reaper" (Swamp People), a television episode

Literature
 The Reaper (magazine), an American literary magazine 1980–1989
 Reaper (novel), a 1998 novel by Ben Mezrich
 The Reaper, a 2015 autobiography, and Reaper, a 2018–2020 novel series, by Nicholas Irving

Music
 "Els Segadors" (The Reapers), national anthem of Catalonia
 "(Don't Fear) The Reaper", a song by Blue Öyster Cult, 1976
 Reaper (band), a German electro-industrial band
 Reaper (album), by Nothing,Nowhere, 2017
 "Reaper" (song), by Sia, 2017
 "Reapers" (song), by Muse, 2016
 The Reaper (album), by Grave Digger, 1993
 "The Reaper" (The Chainsmokers song), 2019

Video games
 Reaper: Tale of a Pale Swordsman, a 2013 action role-playing game
 Reaper, a 1991 ZX Spectrum game

Fictional characters and elements
 Reaper (comics), various characters from the Marvel and DC Comics universes
 Reaper (Overwatch), in the video game Overwatch Reaper, in the video game Ace Combat Infinity Reapers (Doctor Who), in the Doctor Who episode "Father's Day"
 Reapers (Mass Effect), in the original Mass Effect trilogy
 Reapers, in the 2014-2020 TV series The 100 Reapers, and the Reaper virus, in the 2002 film Blade II Reaper virus, in the 2008 film Doomsday The Reapers, introduced in season 10 of the TV series The Walking Dead

Vehicles
 Reaper (sailing vessel), a 1901 restored Fifie fishing boat
 Reaper (schooner), a Massachusetts privateer schooner during the War of 1812
 HMS Reaper (D82), a 1943 United States aircraft carrier leased to the Royal Navy
 General Atomics MQ-9 Reaper, an unmanned aerial vehicle
 Reaper, a gold dredge featured on the TV show Bering Sea Gold''

Other uses
 Reaper (program), software used to remove the Creeper worm
 REAPER (Rapid Environment for Audio Production, Engineering, and Recording), a digital audio workstation software
 Maryland Reapers, an American Indoor Football league team in 2012
 Reaper Miniatures, an American manufacturer of gaming figurines

See also

 "Els Segadors" (lit. "The Reapers"), the anthem of Catalonia
 
 
 Reap (disambiguation)
 Grim Reaper (disambiguation)